The Chin National Party (abbreviated CNP) is a political party in Burma, representing the interests of the Chin people. In the 2010 Burmese general election, CNP contested constituencies only in Chin State and won 9 total seats, 2 in the Pyithu Hluttaw (the lower house), 2 in the Amyotha Hluttaw and 5 in regional hluttaws.

References

Political parties in Myanmar
Political parties established in 2010
2010 establishments in Myanmar